General Czartoryski may refer to:

Adam Kazimierz Czartoryski (1734–1823), Polish–Lithuanian Commonwealth general
August Aleksander Czartoryski (1697–1782), Polish–Lithuanian Commonwealth general
Konstanty Adam Czartoryski (1777–1866), Polish Army brigadier general